Amarjit Singh Sahi  ( - 3 June 2012) was an Indian politician and belonged to the ruling Bharatiya Janta Party. He was a member of Punjab Legislative Assembly and represented Dasuya. He died on 3 June 2012.

Family
His father's name is Ranvir Singh.

Political career
Sahi first became a member of Punjab Legislative Assembly in 2007 by winning election from Dasuya. He successfully contested again in 2012. He was appointed Chief Parliamentary Secretary for revenue.

Personal life
Sahi was married to Sukhjit Kaur Sahi, the present MLA from Dasuya. Sukhjit Kaur was nominated for Dasuya by BJP following Amarjit Singh's death. The couple had one son and one daughter.

Death
Sahi died due to a cardiac arrest on 3 June 2012 in Chandigarh. He was 55 years old at the time of death. He was admitted to PGIMER in Chandigarh following a cardiac arrest, where he died.

References

Punjab, India MLAs 2007–2012
Punjab, India MLAs 2012–2017
Year of birth missing
Place of birth missing
People from Kapurthala district
2012 deaths
Bharatiya Janata Party politicians from Punjab
Members of the Punjab Legislative Assembly